The American music producer and DJ Marshmello has released four studio albums, two extended plays, forty-four singles, nine other charted songs, sixteen remixes, forty-three music videos and seven production-credited songs. Marshmello's debut studio album Joytime was released through his Joytime Collective record label on January 8, 2016. Despite failing to debut on the Billboard 200, the album peaked on three Billboard charts: Dance/Electronic Albums, Top Heatseekers and Independent Albums, at number five, fourteen and forty-one, respectively.

"Keep It Mello", the first and only single from Joytime, charted on the Dance/Electronic Songs chart at number twenty-five. It was also certified gold by the Recording Industry Association of America (RIAA). His follow-up single "Colour" failed to imitate the success of its predecessor as it did not appear on any chart. Marshmello's third single "Alone", however, became his first song to debut on the Billboard Hot 100, peaking at number twenty-eight, and chart in Canada. It was released via the Canadian independent record label Monstercat. The song was also certified platinum in Canada (Music Canada) and the United States (RIAA). Marshmello's following seven singles, which are collaborations with artists such as Far East Movement, Ookay and Slushii, failed to appear on the Billboard Hot 100.

One of his most successful singles "Silence", featuring R&B singer Khalid, was released by RCA Records on August 11, 2017. It charted in the Top 10 of more than fifteen countries such as Germany, Sweden and Norway, and was certified multi-platinum in countries such as Australia, Canada and Sweden. Following that, another of his most successful career singles, a collaboration with pop singer Selena Gomez titled "Wolves", topped the charts in Latvia, Poland and Hungary, and the Billboard Dance/Electronic Songs chart. It was also his highest-charting Billboard Hot 100 song in 2017. His first single of 2018 is a posthumous collaboration with late American rapper Lil Peep, titled "Spotlight". The following single "Friends", released with British singer Anne-Marie, became his highest-charting song on the Billboard Hot 100 at this point, peaking at number eleven. Marshmello's collaboration with rapper Logic titled "Everyday", peaked at number twenty-nine on the Hot 100 while four of his subsequent singles failed to appear on the chart.

Marshmello released his second studio album Joytime II on June 22, 2018, via his Joytime Collective label, featuring two singles, "Tell Me" and "Check This Out". The album became his first to debut on the Billboard 200. His next single is a song with the British band Bastille, titled "Happier", which became his highest-charting song in Canada, Sweden, the United Kingdom and the United States. It received a double-platinum certification in Australia and Canada. Nearly one year after Joytime II, he released Joytime III on July 2, 2019. The album became his first to earn a position on charts in Belgium, Canada, Norway, and Sweden. Two years later, he released Shockwave on June 11, 2021. The album featured four singles.

Albums

Studio albums

Mix albums

Extended plays

Singles

As lead artist

As featured artist

Other charted songs

Non-single album appearances

Remixes

Music videos

Production credits

Notes
Charts

Credits

References

Electronic music discographies